KMCM (96.9 FM), branded as "KMCM 97 Gold Oldies", is a radio station that serves the Midland–Odessa metropolitan area with oldies by broadcasting the Classic Hits satellite feed from ABC Radio Networks.  Its studios are located at the West Texas Radio Group Building on Midkiff Road in Midland, south of Midland Park Mall, and its transmitter is located in Gardendale, Texas. Previously they provided the most live sports in West Texas with high school football for Odessa High School and Permian High School, rotating them each week with sister station KHKX, Central Hockey League games of the Odessa Jackalopes, the Indoor Football League Odessa Roughnecks, and NCAA Texas Tech Red Raiders football and basketball games, which they got from KCRS (AM), and Houston Texans football. During the 2007 season they let go of the Texans rights, in 2009 KFZX acquired the Odessa Jackalopes contract from them also transferring the Monday talk show Hockey Talk, and in 2010 the Roughnecks games were transferred fully to sister station  95.1 BOB FM, leaving only High School Football and Texas Tech sports on KMCM.

References

External links

MCM
Oldies radio stations in the United States
Radio stations established in 1985
1985 establishments in Texas